Iran first competed at the Paralympic Games in 1988, at the Summer Games in Seoul, South Korea.

Medals

Medals by Summer Games

Medals by Winter Games

Medals by Summer Sport

Medals by Winter Sport

Sport by year

Summer Paralympics

Winter Paralympics

Medalists

1988

1992

1996

2000

2004

2008

2012

2016

2020

Multi medallists 
This is a list of multiple gold medalists for Iran, listing people who have won three or more gold medals.

See also 
 Iran at the Summer Olympics
 Iran men's national sitting volleyball team

References